The , abbreviated to KaDeWe, is a department store in Berlin, Germany. It attracts 40,000 to 50,000 visitors every day.

The store is located on Tauentzienstraße, a major shopping street, between Wittenbergplatz and Breitscheidplatz, near the heart of former West Berlin. It is technically in the extreme northwest of the south Berlin neighborhood of Schöneberg.

Since 2015, KaDeWe has been owned by the Central Group, a Thailand-based international department store conglomerate.

History

Empire and Weimar Republic: the Jandorf Era
The businessman Adolf Jandorf had opened six stores for basic needs with his company A. Jandorf & Co. in Berlin by 1905. Like the competitor stores Wertheim Leipziger Strasse (1894) and the Warenhaus Tietz (1900), also on Leipziger Strasse, Jandorf wanted to cater for the high consumer desires of the Wilhelminism elite. Jandorf's seventh branch was supposed to "satisfy the spoiled demands of the top ten thousand, the top one thousand, the very top five hundred," as the weekly cultural magazine  wrote. With a GmbH of the same name founded especially for this purpose, in which his partner company M.J. Emden Söhne (Hamburg) held a four per cent stake, Jandorf began planning the new store in 1905 under the name Kaufhaus des Westens (KaDeWe). It was planned that the term Kaufhaus (department store) should set itself apart from the usual store and wholesaling warehouse. The abbreviation KaDeWe was used from the start and, according to a commemorative publication from 1932, was based on the abbreviation of company names that had become common in the US at the time.

The department store was built to designs by the architect . It opened on 27 March 1907 with an area of 24,000 sq m.

In June 1927, ownership changed to Hermann Tietz, who was responsible for modernizing and expanding the store. He wanted to add two new floors, but because of the Nazi rise to power in the 1930s these plans came to a sudden halt.

Nazi era 
Hermann Tietz was a Jewish-owned partnership and because of the Nazis' anti-Jewish laws the company was aryanized—that is, transferred to non-Jewish owners—and its name changed to Hertie. 

During World War II, Allied bombing ruined most of the store, with one shot-down American bomber actually crashing into it in 1943. Most of the store was gutted, which caused its closure.

Postwar 
The re-opening of the first two floors was celebrated in 1950. Full reconstruction of all seven floors was finished by 1956. "KaDeWe" soon became a symbol of the regained economic power of West Germany during the Wirtschaftswunder economic boom, as well as emblematic of the material prosperity of West Berlin versus that of the East.

Between 1976 and 1978, the store's floor space was expanded from 24,000 sq m to 44,000 sq m. Just after the fall of the Berlin Wall in 1989, KaDeWe recorded a record-breaking number of people going through the store. By 1996, with a further floor and restaurant added, the sales area had expanded to 60,000 sq m.

In 1994, the KarstadtQuelle AG corporation acquired Hertie and with it, KaDeWe. Most of the floors were renovated between 2004 and 2007 in preparation for the store's one hundredth anniversary.

In January 2014, a majority stake in Karstadt Premium GmbH was acquired by the Signa Holding GmbH. In 2015, it was acquired by the Bangkok-based Central Group.

In March 2021, the company joined the Fur Free Retailer Program (FFRP).

Features

KaDeWe has eight floors, each focused on a different type of merchandise.

The ground floor is for beauty accessories and luxury goods. The services offered include beauty salons as well as nail and foot spas.

The so-called "Luxury Boulevard" is also situated here, with various luxury brands.

The 1st floor for is men's apparel.

The 2nd floor is devoted to women's fashion.

The 3rd floor is referred to as "the Loft" and is Germany's biggest luxury shoe department. Women's leather goods and lingerie are also sold here.

The 4th floor contains interior and design items, as well as the in-house wedding and gift registry services.

The 5th floor is for arts, books, entertainment, electronics, toys, office supplies, and souvenirs.

The 6th and 7th floors are entirely devoted to food, and are advertised as having two football fields of food. The 6th floor food hall is called "Delicatessen" and is famous for its wide variety of food and beverages. It has around 110 cooks and 40 bakers and confectioners, supplying more than 30 gourmet counters. The top floor (added in the early 1990s) includes a winter garden with a 1000-seat restaurant surrounded by an all-windowed wall offering a view over the Wittenbergplatz.

Media 

In 2021 a six-part TV mini-series set in and around the store was produced in Germany, based on the somewhat fictionalised lives of Harry Jandorf (son of the store's founder), Georg Karg (the store's manager), together with two completely fictional characters, Fritzi Jandorf (daughter of the store's founder) and Hedi (a store worker), set between the end of World War I and the aryanisation of the store as the Nazis came to power. The series was shown in BBC4's Saturday night "foreign language" slot in mid-2022, subtitled in English.

Bibliography 
 Antonia Meiners: 100 Jahre KaDeWe. Nicolaische Verlagsbuchhandlung, Berlin 2007, 168 p., 80 colour photos, 80 b&w photos, clothbound, summary in german
 Nils Busch-Petersen: Adolf Jandorf – Vom Volkswarenhaus zum KaDeWe, Hentrich & Hentrich, Berlin 2007, 80 p.,

References

External links 

KaDeWe - Kaufhaus des Westens in Berlin, (English)
 Europe's Biggest Department Store featuring history of KaDeWe, berlin-life.com
 „Seventh Heaven“, Christophorus, No. 326, The Porsche Magazine, June/July 2007, p. 66 - 74.
„Not heaven, but not hell either“, signandsight.com, December 22, 2005 by Roger Boyes
Fare Of The Country; In One Berlin Store, Food Without End, New York Times, March 10, 1991

Buildings and structures in Tempelhof-Schöneberg
Culture in Berlin
Department stores of Germany
Food halls
Tourist attractions in Berlin
1907 establishments in Germany
Retail companies established in 1907
Companies acquired from Jews under Nazi rule